Molly Parker is a Canadian actress whose accolades include two Genie Awards, one Leo Award, one Primetime Emmy Award nomination, and three Screen Actors Guild Award nominations.

Parker first gained critical recognition for her performance in the controversial drama Kissed (1996), for which she won the Genie Award for Best Actress. She later gained recognition for her role in the drama The Center of the World (2001), which saw her nominated for the Independent Spirit Award for Best Female Lead. She would subsequently gain critical notice for her portrayal of Alma Garret	on the American television series Deadwood, earning a Screen Actors Guild Award for Best Ensemble. Parker was nominated within the same category in 2015 and 2016, respectively, for her work on House of Cards, a role which also saw her nominated for the Primetime Emmy for Outstanding Guest Actress (2016).

Canadian Screen Awards

Gemini Awards
The Gemini Awards were awards given by the Academy of Canadian Cinema & Television to recognize the achievements of Canada's television industry.

Genie Awards
The Genie Awards were given out annually by the Academy of Canadian Cinema and Television to recognize the best of Canadian cinema from 1980–2012.

Gotham Awards
Presented by the Independent Filmmaker Project, the Gotham Awards award the best in independent film.

Independent Spirit Awards
The Independent Spirit Awards are presented annually by Film Independent, to award best in the independent filmmaking.

Leo Awards
The Leo Awards are an awards program for the British Columbia film and television industry.

Málaga Film Festival
The Málaga Film Festival is held annually in Málaga, Spain, honoring achievements in film.

Primetime Emmy Awards
The Primetime Emmy Awards are presented annually by the Academy of Television Arts & Sciences, also known as the Television Academy, to recognize and honor achievements in the television industry.

Saturn Awards
The Saturn Awards are presented annually by the Academy of Science Fiction, Fantasy, and Horror Films to honor science fiction, fantasy, and horror films, television, and home video.

Screen Actors Guild Awards
The Screen Actors Guild Awards are organized by the Screen Actors Guild‐American Federation of Television and Radio Artists. First awarded in 1995, the awards aim to recognize excellent achievements in film and television.

Taormina International Film Festival
The Taormina International Film Festival is held annually in Taormina, Italy, honoring achievements in film.

Toronto International Film Festival
The Toronto International Film Festival, founded in 1976, is held annually in Toronto, Ontario, honoring achievements in film.

Critics associations

References

Lists of awards received by Canadian actor